The Type 091 (Chinese designation: 09-I; NATO reporting name: Han class) is a first-generation nuclear-powered attack submarine produced by China. It was the first nuclear submarine employed by the People's Liberation Army Navy Submarine Force, and the first indigenously-produced nuclear attack submarine in Asia.

Background
The Chinese naval nuclear power program started in July 1958 when the Central Military Commission gave approval to start the Type 091 submarine project. Mao Zedong declared that China would build nuclear attack submarines "even if it took ten thousand years." Peng Shilu was the first chief designer of this project. The first submarine in the class, Changzheng 1 ("Long March 1"), was commissioned in 1974; the last was launched in 1990.   In 1983, Peng moved to the civilian development of nuclear power plants, and he was succeeded at the nuclear submarine project by Huang Xuhua.

The Type 091 has operated mainly in local waters, and has been involved in several incidents. One submarine shadowed the Kitty Hawk carrier battle group in October 1994, provoking a stand-off. Another entered Japanese territorial waters near Ishigaki Island (part of Okinawa Prefecture) near Taiwan in November 2004, causing the Japan Maritime Self-Defense Force to go on alert for the second time since the Second World War; China apologized for the trespass and blamed "technical reasons" on the submarine.

The boats have received major upgrades and numerous refits since commissioning. They have six  torpedo tubes and carry 20 torpedoes. Alternatively, they can carry 36 mines in their tubes. It is capable of firing sub-launched variants of the C-801 anti-ship missile as well as a range of indigenous and Russian torpedoes or mines. All remaining hulls have been refitted with new sonars, with Type H/SQ2-262B sonar manufactured by No. 613 Factory replacing the original Type 603 sonar on board. Anechoic tiles were added later to reduce noise levels.

Criticism
The Type 091 is extremely noisy and has poor radiation shielding, a result of being based on 1950s technology. It cannot launch missiles while submerged. Overall, the submarine's tactical utility is limited against modern combatants.

Failed lease to Pakistan

In 1989, Pakistan made an abortive attempt to procure a Type 091 for USD$63 million in 1992, as a response to the Soviet K-43 leased to India in 1988. Occasional rumours of Pakistani interest in a Type 091 continued to surface as late as 2012; any purchase would be useful mainly as an antiquated training platform.

Units

See also
 List of submarine classes in service
 Cruise missile submarine
 Attack submarine

References

Sources 
 
 
 

 
Submarine classes